Raorchestes thodai is a species of frog of the genus Raorchestes found in Ooty in the Nilgiris district of the Western Ghats of Tamil Nadu in India. The species is named after the Thoda tribe who dwell in the region.

References

External links
 

thodai
Frogs of India
Endemic fauna of the Western Ghats
Amphibians described in 2011